Saints Tancred, Torthred, and Tova were three Anglo-Saxon siblings who were saints, hermits and martyrs of the Ninth century. Their feast day was celebrated on 30 September at Thorney and Deeping.

Lives
The brothers Tancred and Torthred, with their sister Tova lived at Thorney, Cambridgeshire, at the time little more than a collection of hermit cells in the Fens, rather than a monastic institution. They, like many hermits at Thorney, were killed by the Danes in 870.Nothing other than their martyrdom is known of them.

Provenance
The story of their martyrdom rests on the chronicle of Pseudo-Ingulf, an oft unreliable document which includes sources older than the 12th century. They were, however, venerated in Thorney Abbey by the year 1000AD, as witnessed by R.P.S., C.S.P. and William of Malmesbury, and were among the many saints whose bodies were translated by Ethelwold.
The first record of their existence dates 973AD when they were installed in the abbey at Thorney.

Torthred of Thorney
Saint Torthred of Thorney was a saint and Hermit of the ninth century in Anglo-Saxon England. According to Pseudo-Ingulf he was martyred with many of his brother monks by pagan Danish raiders in 869.
His feast day is sometimes celebrated on 9 April or 10 April, and there is some conjecture that Torthred (and possibly Tova) did not die in the 869AD raids and instead lived his last years at Cerne in Dorset, in a similar way to Eadwold of Cerne.

References

External links

Medieval English saints
9th-century English people
9th-century Christian saints
East Anglian saints
Roman Catholic monks
English Christian monks
Year of birth unknown
Year of death unknown

9th-century English women
9th-century Christian monks
English hermits
Female saints of medieval England